The Sense Apparatus is the first album by Frantic Bleep.

Drums were recorded at Huset; guitars were recorded at Breidablikk; vocals recorded at Engelaug & Knapper; and bass, overdubs and additional vocals were recorded at Tora Bora Studios. All engineering, producing and mixing were done by guitarist, Patrick Scantlebury. Mixed at Tora Bora Studios in September 2004 and mastered by Tom Kvålsvoll at Strype Audio on October 12, 2004. All lyrics are by Paul Mozart Bjørke. Cover art is by Christian Ruud.

Track listing
"A Survey" (Scantlebury) – 1:19
"The Expulsion" (Scantlebury) – 5:04
"Sins of Omission" (Scantlebury) – 5:12
"…But a Memory" (Scantlebury) – 3:52
"Mausolos" (Scantlebury) – 4:38
"Curtainraiser" (Scantlebury, Sundstrom) – 5:47
"Mandaughter" (Scantlebury, Sundstrom) – 5:48
"Nebulous Termini" (Scantlebury) – 6:22
"Cone" (Scantlebury) – 3:24

Credits
 Patrick Scantlebury - Lead guitar, synthesizers, production, engineering, mixing
 Eywin Sundstrom - guitar
 Stein Erik Svendheim - drums
 Paul Mozart Bjørke - vocals, bass
 Daniel Solheim - lead vocals on "Sins of Omission"
 Agnete M. Kirkevaag - backing vocals
 Kjetil Foseid - lead vocals on "Curtainraiser"
 Odd E. Ebbesen - backing vocals
 Per Øyvind Bjerknes - backing vocals

2005 debut albums
Frantic Bleep albums
The End Records albums